Scolopostethus is a genus of dirt-colored seed bugs in the family Rhyparochromidae. There are more than 30 described species in Scolopostethus.

Species
These 34 species belong to the genus Scolopostethus:

 Scolopostethus abdominalis Jakovlev, 1890
 Scolopostethus affinis (Schilling, 1829)
 Scolopostethus afropunctulatus Scudder, 1962
 Scolopostethus atlanticus Horvath, 1893
 Scolopostethus chinensis Zheng & Zou, 1981
 Scolopostethus cognatus Fieber, 1861
 Scolopostethus coleoptratus Slater, 1993
 Scolopostethus daulius Linnavuori, 1978
 Scolopostethus decoratus (Hahn, 1833)
 Scolopostethus diffidens Horvath, 1893
 Scolopostethus eros Linnavuori, 1978
 Scolopostethus grandis Horvath, 1880
 Scolopostethus hirsutus Zheng & Zou, 1987
 Scolopostethus kilimandjariensis Scudder, 1962
 Scolopostethus lethierryi Jakovlev, 1877
 Scolopostethus maderensis Reuter, 1881
 Scolopostethus maumus Scudder, 1962
 Scolopostethus merus Scudder, 1962
 Scolopostethus montanus (Distant, 1909)
 Scolopostethus morimotoi (Hidaka, 1964)
 Scolopostethus ornandus Distant, 1904
 Scolopostethus pacificus Barber, 1918
 Scolopostethus patruelis Horvath, 1892
 Scolopostethus pictus (Schilling, 1829)
 Scolopostethus pilosus Reuter, 1874
 Scolopostethus pseudograndis Wagner, 1950
 Scolopostethus puberulus Horvath, 1887
 Scolopostethus quadratus Zheng & Zou, 1981
 Scolopostethus silvicolus Linnavuori, 1978
 Scolopostethus takeyai Hidaka, 1963
 Scolopostethus thomsoni Reuter, 1874
 Scolopostethus tropicus (Distant, 1893)
 Scolopostethus ulugurus Scudder, 1962
 † Scolopostethus statzi Wagner, 1950

References

External links

 

Drymini
Articles created by Qbugbot